Lukáš Dlouhý and Michal Mertiňák were the defending champions, but Dlouhy chose not to participate, and only Mertinak competed that year.
Mertinak partnered with Petr Pála, and won in the final 2–6, 6–3, [10–5], against Carlos Berlocq and Fabio Fognini.

Seeds

Draw

Draw

External links
 Draw

Doubles